Dododou is a village located in the southern part of the Ivory Coast. It is in the sub-prefecture of Goudouko, Lakota Department, Lôh-Djiboua Region, Gôh-Djiboua District.

References

Populated places in Gôh-Djiboua District
Populated places in Lôh-Djiboua